The National Union of Public Workers (NUPW) is a trade union in Barbados. It represents 10,000 workers, mainly in the public sector. It was established in 1944, and registered as a trade union in 1964. In 1971 it changed its name from the Barbados Civil Service Association (BSCSA).

References

Trade unions in Barbados
Caribbean Congress of Labour
UNI Global Union
Public Services International
Public sector trade unions
Trade unions established in 1944